Mitchell, Hutchins & Co. was a securities research firm based in New York City. In 1977, it was acquired by Paine Webber.

History
The firm was founded in 1919 in Chicago, Illinois, by William H. Mitchell and James C. Hutchins, Jr., members of two prominent Chicago banking families involved with the Illinois Bank & Trust. The firm's first officers were W. Edwin Stanley (president), Hutchins, J. Ogden Armour, Chauncey Keep, Charles Garfield King (vice presidents), Robert A. Gardner (treasurer), and Mitchell (secretary). Its first stockholders included John J. Mitchell, William Wrigley Jr., and Albert Lasker.

In 1965, the company acquired D.B. Marron & Company, founded in 1959 by Donald Marron. In 1967, Marron was named president of the company. Under Marron, the firm's prominence grew significantly. 

In 1975, the firm was chosen as the best research firm on Wall Street by portfolio managers.

In 1977, Mitchell Hutchins was acquired by Paine Webber. Paine Webber continued to use the Mitchell Hutchins brand until the company was acquired by UBS in 2000.

In 2001, Mitchell Hutchins was merged into Brinson Partners.

References

UBS
Defunct financial services companies of the United States
Financial services companies established in 1919
Financial services companies disestablished in 1977
Former investment banks of the United States
1919 establishments in Illinois
1977 disestablishments in Illinois